Bhoja II may refer to any of the following Indian kings: 

 Bhoja II (Gurjara-Pratihara dynasty), 910–913 CE
 Bhoja II (Shilahara dynasty), 1175–1212 CE
 Bhoja II (Paramara dynasty), 13th century CE